Dewri Mandir is a mandir situated in Diuri village, Tamar near Ranchi in Jharkhand in India.  It is located near the Tata-Ranchi Highway (NH33). The main attraction of this ancient mandir is, 700 year old murti of the Goddess Durga, Kali. The murti have  16 hands (Normally Goddess Durga has 8 Hands). It is an ancient Mandir and It was renovated few years back. The ancient mandir was constructed by interlocking stones without using chalk or binding material. This temple is also known as, Mata Dewri Diri in tribal Bhumij Munda languages.

At the temple devotees tie yellow and red sacred threads on bamboo for the fulfilment of their wishes. Upon the fulfillment of their wishes, they again come to the temple and untie the thread. Dedicated to Solha Bhuji Goddess, an avatar of Goddess Durga, Dewri Mandir temple is located a little outside the main city of Ranchi. Spread over nearly two acres, this old temple in Ranchi also houses an idol of Lord Shiva here. As per the Legends, whoever has tried to alter the structure of this temple, has had to face the wrath of the gods and suffer consequences. Dewri Temple is also believed to be the only temple where six tribal priests, known as Pahans, perform rituals and offer prayers alongside the Brahmin priests, who are mainly known as Pandas. Located about 60 km from Ranchi, this temple is on the right side of the Ranchi-Tata road, toward the town of Tamar.

Architecture 
It is said that this Mandir was built during 10th to 12th century. The doors of this Mandir is made up of stone. This Mandir's deity's Murti have sixteen hands. According to the media reports this Mandir's murti's architecture style is similar to the murti's found in temples of Odisha state.

Deity 
This mandir is of Maa (mother) Deudi Devi. Devadi Maa is Maa Kali. The Murti of the deity has 16 arms and it is 3 foot tall. Deity is holding bow, shield, flower and param in her arms. Deori Maa's Murti have different types of Gold jewelry. This deity's name also reported as Dewri devi.

Legends 
According to a legend associated with this Mandir this Mandir was built by Adivasi king Kera. It is believed that this Mandir is 700 years old. It is said that this temple was established in year 1300 by King Kera, a Munda king of Singhbhum. Legends says that the king established, built this Mandir, when he was returning from a war after defeating. He established this temple at this very place and by the blessings of goddess Ma (Mother) Kali he got his state back.

According to anathor legend, Chamru pandas (Brahmin) use to come to visit two times in a year to the king of this region. The king asked them to live in this place to do puja, and they started to live at this place. One day these Brahmins was doing tapasya in this wild, when goddess gave darshan (visit) to them and said she wants to meet them. The Brahmins told this incident to the king. King cleared this temple's area, during this work they found a black stone. The labours returned their respective homes after being tired, they came next day to do work when they saw a mandir formed at this place.

Some peoples believes that this mandir was built by Emperor Ashok, when he was on the war campaign of Kalinga (Now knows as Odisha).

Mandir 
The Mandir have impact of tribal culture (specially Bhumij tribes). Here tribal peoples do the work of everyday puja. The temple is situated near Ranchi of Jharkhand. Tribal pahans (prist) do the puja for six days of week and only one day a Brhamin do the work of puja at this temple. The Garbhagriha have the murti of Maa Deudi Devi.

• Renovation

This mandir is renovated. The new temple bult around the ancient Mandir, which was said to bulit in 1300 A.D. A compound wall built around this temple. Artist from Odisha done the work of design carvings. The priests of this temple do not know exactly how old is this Mandir.

Administration 
In October 2020 the district government took over the charge of the temple management after frequent complaints of wrongdoings and lack of transparency in the functioning. It is administered by 13 member committee, which have representatives from administration, 2 public representatives and rest from are from temple and nearby village's citizens. Beforere that the temple was run by few priest and some locals, who alleged to mismanagement.

References

Temples in Jharkhand
Hindu temples in Jharkhand
Durga temples
Kali temples